Order of Military Merit  may refer to:
 Order of Military Merit (Brazil) Ordem do Mérito Militar
 Order of Military Merit (Bulgaria), National Order "For Military Merit"
 Order of Military Merit (Canada)
 Order of Military Merit (Dominican Republic)
 Order of Military Merit (France)
 Ordre du Mérite militaire (France)
 German States:
 Military Merit Order (Bavaria)
 Military Merit Order (Württemberg)
 Karl-Friedrich Order of Military Merit (Baden)
 Order of Military Merit (Jordan)
 Order of Military Merit (South Korea) 
 Order of Military Merit (Mexico)
 Order of Military Merit (Morocco)
 Order of Military Merit (Paraguay)
 Order of Military Merit (Romania)
 Order of Military Merit (Spain) (Orden del Mérito Militar)
 Order of Military Merit (Russia)
 Order of Military Merit (Yugoslavia)
 Order of Military Merit (Bangladesh)

See also
Military Merit Cross (disambiguation)
Military Merit Medal (disambiguation)
Military Merit Order (disambiguation)
Order of merit

Military awards and decorations
Orders of merit